Leat is an unincorporated community in Cherry County, Nebraska, United States.

A post office was established at Leat in 1915, and remained in operation until it was discontinued in 1920.

References

Unincorporated communities in Cherry County, Nebraska
Unincorporated communities in Nebraska